Eucamptognathus lafertei is a species of ground beetle in the subfamily Pterostichinae. It was described by Chevrolat in 1839.

References

Eucamptognathus
Beetles described in 1839